Lichtenrade is a German locality (Ortsteil) within the borough (Bezirk) of Tempelhof-Schöneberg, Berlin. Until 2001 it was part of the former borough of Tempelhof.

History
The locality was first mentioned in 1375, named Lichtenrode. Autonomous Prussian municipality of the former Teltow district, Lichtenrade was incorporated into Berlin in 1920, with the "Greater Berlin Act". During World War II, a branch of the Sachsenhausen concentration camp was located in this locality. After 1941, prisoners of war from Ukraine were interned in the camp. During the Cold War it was a part of West Berlin bordering with East Germany. Its long boundary with Brandenburg was surrounded by the Berlin Wall from 1961 to 1989.

Geography
Located in the southern suburb of Berlin, it is one of the southernmost areas of the city, largely bounded by the Brandenburger municipalities of Schönefeld (Dahme-Spreewald district), Blankenfelde-Mahlow and Großbeeren (both in Teltow-Fläming district). It borders with the Berliner localities of Marienfelde, Mariendorf and Buckow (this one in the district of Neukölln).

Transportation
Lichtenrade is served by the S-Bahn line S2 at the stations of Schichauweg and Lichtenrade. The locality is also crossed, from north to south, by the federal highway B96.

Photogallery

Personalities
Christian Fiedler (b. 1975), former football player
Klaus Wowereit (b. 1953), politician, former mayor of Berlin

References

Literature
Barbara Gehrts: "Nie wieder ein Wort davon?". Union Verlag, Stuttgart 1975,

External links

Localities of Berlin

Populated places established in the 1370s